Robert Martin Adams (1915 – December 16, 1996) was an American literary scholar.

Biography 
Adams was born Robert Martin Krapp in New York City in 1915. He was the son of George Philip Krapp, a Columbia University English professor, and grandson of Swedish painter Carl Frederick von Saltza. His uncle was muralist Philip von Saltza.

Adams received his B.A., M.A. and Ph.D., all from Columbia University, and changed his name after serving in the army during World War II. Adams taught at Columbia, Rutgers, and the University of Wisconsin–Madison, before joining the Cornell University faculty in 1950. His students at Cornell included future Princeton University professor and Kafka scholar Stanley Corngold. He joined the University of California, Los Angeles faculty in 1968 and retired in 1979.

Adams received the Guggenheim Fellowship twice, once in 1959, and a second time in 1974. He was one of the founding editors of The Norton Anthology of English Literature and an editor of the Hudson Review.

Adams was a 1978 National Book Award for Translated Literature finalist for translating Niccolò Machiavelli's The Prince.

Personal life and family 
Adams died on December 16, 1996, in Santa Fe, New Mexico. He was survived by his wife, and his son, Nicholas Adams, who is an emeritus professor of architecture at Vassar College.

References 

1915 births

1996 deaths
Columbia College (New York) alumni
Columbia Graduate School of Arts and Sciences alumni
Columbia University faculty
Rutgers University faculty
University of Wisconsin–Madison faculty
American editors
University of California, Los Angeles faculty
Cornell University faculty
American academics of English literature